Kali Yuga, in Hinduism, is the fourth and worst of the four yugas (world ages) in a Yuga Cycle, preceded by Dvapara Yuga and followed by the next cycle's Krita (Satya) Yuga. It is believed to be the present age, which is full of conflict and sin.

The "Kali" of Kali Yuga means "strife", "discord", "quarrel", or "contention" and Kali Yuga is associated with the demon Kali (not to be confused with the goddess Kālī).

According to Puranic sources, Krishna's death marked the end of Dvapara Yuga and the start of Kali Yuga, which is dated to 17/18 February 3102 BCE. Lasting for 432,000 years (1,200 divine years), Kali Yuga began  years ago and has  years left as of  CE. Kali Yuga will end in the year 428,899 CE.

Etymology 

Kali Yuga means "the age of Kali (demon)", "the age of darkness", "the age of vice and misery", or "the age of quarrel and hypocrisy".

A complete description of Kali Yuga is found in the Mahabharata, Manusmriti, Vishnu Smriti, and various Puranas. It is used mathematically in the astronomical texts Aryabhatiya and Surya Siddhanta.

Epigraphy 
According to P. V. Kane, one of the earliest inscriptions with one of the four yugas named is the Pikira grant of Pallava Simhavarman (mid-5th centuryCE):

Other epigraphs exist with named yugas in the Old Mysore region of India, published in Epigraphia Carnatica.

Start date 

According to the Surya Siddhanta, Kali Yuga began at midnight (00:00) on 18 February 3102 BCE. This is also considered the date on which Krishna left the earth to return to Vaikuntha. This information is placed at the temple of Bhalka, the place of this incident (see photo).

According to the astronomer and mathematician Aryabhata, Kali Yuga started in 3102 BCE. He finished his book Aryabhattiyam in 499 CE, in which he gave the exact year of the beginning of Kali Yuga. He writes that he wrote the book in the "year 3600 of the Kali Age" at the age of 23. As it was the 3600th year of the Kali Age when he was 23 years old, and given that Aryabhata was born in 476 CE, the beginning of the Kali Yuga will come to (3600 - (476 + 23) + 1 (One year from 1 BCE to 1 CE)) = 3102 BCE.

According to K. D. Abhyankar, the starting point of Kali Yuga is an extremely rare planetary alignment, which is depicted in the Mohenjo-daro seals. Going by this alignment, the year 3102 BCE is slightly off. The actual date for this alignment is 7 February 3104 BCE. There is also sufficient proof to believe that Vrddha Garga knew of precessions at least by 500 BCE. Garga had calculated the rate of precession to within 30% of what the modern scholars estimate.

Duration and structure 

Hindu texts describe four yugas (world ages)⁠ in a Yuga Cycle, where, starting in order from the first age of Krita (Satya) Yuga, each yuga's length decreases by one-fourth (25%), giving proportions of 4:3:2:1. Each yuga is described as having a main period ( yuga proper) preceded by its  (dawn) and followed by its  (dusk)⁠, where each twilight (dawn/dusk) lasts for one-tenth (10%) of its main period. Lengths are given in divine years (years of the gods), each lasting for 360 solar (human) years.

Kali Yuga, the fourth age in a cycle, lasts for 432,000 years (1,200 divine years), where its main period lasts for 360,000 years (1,000 divine years) and its two twilights each lasts for 36,000 years (100 divine years). The current cycle's Kali Yuga, the present age, has the following dates based on it starting in 3102BCE:

Mahabharata, Book 12 (Shanti Parva), Ch. 231:

Manusmriti, Ch. 1:

Surya Siddhanta, Ch. 1:

Characteristics 
Hinduism often symbolically represents morality (dharma) as an Indian bull. In the Satya Yuga, the first stage of development, the bull has four legs, which is reduced by one in each age that follows. By the age of Kali, morality is reduced to only a quarter of that of the golden age, so that the bull of Dharma has only one leg.

References in the Mahabharata
The Kurukshetra War and the decimation of Kauravas thus happened at the Yuga-Sandhi, the point of transition from one yuga to another. The scriptures mention Narada as having momentarily intercepted the demon Kali on his way to the Earth when Duryodhana was about to be born in order to make him an embodiment of arishadvargas and adharma in preparation of the era of decay in values and the consequent havoc.

Prophesied events 
A discourse by Markandeya in the Mahabharata identifies some of the attributes of people, animals, nature, and weather during the Kali Yuga.

10,000-year Golden Age 

The Brahma Vaivarta Purana (related to Rathantara kalpa) mentions a 10,000-year period, starting from the traditional dating of the Kali Yuga epoch, during which bhakti yogis will be present.

In Sikhism 

Guru Granth Sahib on Ang:1185 says:

References in the Dasam Granth 
In the "Nehkalanki Avatar" section of Chaubis Avatar, Guru Gobind Singh describes the characteristics of the Kali Yuga before the incarnation of Kalki. The author details various attitudes and actions that he perceives to be adharmic becoming increasingly prevalent among humans, including irreligion and engrossment in kama (sexual pleasure).

In the "Bridh Naraaj" stanza of "Nehkalanki Avatar", the author states:

Other usage 
The Kali Yuga is an important concept in both Theosophy and Anthroposophy, and in the writings of Helena Blavatsky, W.Q. Judge, Rudolf Steiner, Savitri Devi, and Traditionalist philosophers such as René Guénon and Julius Evola, among others. Rudolf Steiner believed that the Kali Yuga ended in 1900.

See also 
 Hindu eschatology
 Hindu units of time
 Kalpa (day of Brahma)
 Manvantara (age of Manu)
 Pralaya (period of dissolution)
 Yuga Cycle (four yuga ages): Satya (Krita), Treta, Dvapara, and Kali
 Historicity of the Mahabharata
 Itihasa (Hindu Tradition)
 List of numbers in Hindu scriptures
 Puranic chronology

Notes

References

Further reading

External links 

Eight Yugas
Four Yugas
Hindu eschatology
Kali (demon)
Prophecy in Hinduism